Mark Matheson (born February 1, 1984) is a Canadian professional ice hockey player, who was last signed to EIHL side Nottingham Panthers where he served as player and interim coach. Matheson previously spent time with Gyergyói HK and had played two seasons with Nottingham's rival Sheffield Steelers. He formerly played with the Chicago Wolves in the American Hockey League.

Career statistics

References

External links

1984 births
Living people
Canadian ice hockey defencemen
Chicago Wolves players
Cincinnati Cyclones (ECHL) players
Linköping HC players
Milwaukee Admirals players
Stavanger Oilers players
Dragons de Rouen players
UMass Minutemen ice hockey players
Vienna Capitals players
Sheffield Steelers players
Nottingham Panthers players
Canadian expatriate ice hockey players in England
Canadian expatriate ice hockey players in Austria
Canadian expatriate ice hockey players in Norway
Canadian expatriate ice hockey players in Sweden